Soulforce is a U.S.-based social justice organization that works to end the religious and political oppression of lesbian, gay, bisexual, transgender, queer, and intersex (LGBTQI) people. The organization's co-executive directors are Alba Onofrio and Yaz Mendez Nuñez.

History 
It was founded in 1998 by Gary Nixon and his husband Mel White, who was a ghostwriter for Jerry Falwell, Billy Graham, Pat Robertson, and others until he came out as a gay man.

Programs

Equality Ride

Since 2006, Soulforce has supported a project called the Equality Ride. Led by young adults, it targets Christian colleges. In 2007 it was divided into two different trips (eastern and western), each leg visiting 15-20 different colleges. Other rides were launched in 2008, 2010, 2012, 2014, and 2016.

GiveBackIX

Right to Serve Campaign
In 2006 Soulforce organized the Right to Serve Campaign, the first nationally organized youth effort to bring attention to the "don't ask, don't tell" policy of the United States Armed Forces. Youth in 30 cities across the country were recruited to organize events in which openly lesbian, gay and bisexual youth attempted to enlist in the United States Armed Forces while stating their sexual orientation. Headed by Jacob Reitan and Haven Herrin, it took place in 30 cities from late summer and fall of 2006. 

In May, in Roseville, a suburb of Minneapolis, two men and a woman tried to enlist in the Minnesota National Guard. One application was rejected immediately and the others put on hold. On August 30, in Madison, Wisconsin, an Army recruiter turned away three men, one a college graduate and the others college students. One of them said: "We're not here as a publicity stunt. I want to serve alongside my fellow Americans. That's why we're here." Two men turned away by recruiters in Chicago on September 12, 2006, returned the next day and staged a sit-in. A University of Maryland sophomore was turned away when she tried to enlist on September 26. Other events, some including arrests, occurred in New York; Austin, Texas; and Greensboro, North Carolina. In New York City, the recruitment center was closed, but the Right to Serve protesters staged a seven-hour sit-in.

See also

LGBT-welcoming church programs

References

External links
 

Nonviolence organizations based in the United States
LGBT political advocacy groups in the United States
Don't ask, don't tell